Bemani Rural District is a rural district (dehestan) in the Central District of Sirik County, Hormozgan Province, Iran. At the 2006 census, its population was 11,633, in 2,078 families. The rural district has 19 villages.

References 

Rural Districts of Hormozgan Province
Sirik County